Aeruginospora singularis is a species of fungus in the family Hygrophoraceae. The species, described by Franz Xaver Rudolf von Höhnel in 1908, is found in Indonesia. The type specimen of this species was found growing in soil under bamboo at the Bogor Botanical Gardens, and it has been found there twice since then.

References

External links

Hygrophoraceae
Fungi of Asia
Fungi described in 1908
Taxa named by Franz Xaver Rudolf von Höhnel